XHMQ-FM is a radio station on 98.7 FM in Querétaro, Querétaro. The station is owned by Respuesta Radiofónica and carries a grupera format known as La Jefa.

History
XHMQ began with a concession awarded to Voz y Música, S.A., in 1987. It was originally owned by Radiorama.

References

Radio stations in Querétaro